Herbert Aceituno (born 1 November 1985) is a Salvadoran Paralympic powerlifter of short stature. He is a bronze medalist at the 2020 Summer Paralympics held in Tokyo, Japan, a silver medalist at the 2021 World Para Powerlifting Championships held  in Tbilisi, Georgia and a gold medalist at the 2019 Parapan American Games held in Lima, Peru.

Career 

He competed in the men's 72 kg event at the 2016 Summer Paralympics held in Rio de Janeiro, Brazil without a successful lift. He was also the flag bearer for El Salvador during the Parade of Nations at the opening ceremony of the event.

He won the bronze medal in the men's 59 kg event at the 2020 Summer Paralympics held in Tokyo, Japan. It became the first ever medal achievement for El Salvador at the Paralympics. He was also one of the flag bearers for El Salvador during the Parade of Nations as part of the opening ceremony of the 2020 Summer Paralympics. A few months later, he won the silver medal in his event at the 2021 World Para Powerlifting Championships held in Tbilisi, Georgia. This was the first ever medal achievement for El Salvador at the World Para Powerlifting Championships.

At the 2017 World Para Powerlifting Championships held in Mexico City, Mexico, he finished in 8th place in the men's 65 kg event. In July 2019, he competed at the World Para Powerlifting Championships held in Nur-Sultan, Kazakhstan. A month later, at the Parapan American Games held in Lima, Peru, he won the gold medal in the men's 65 kg event. He also set a new Parapan American record of 182 kg. In December 2019, at the inaugural Panam Sports Awards, Aceituno won the award of Best Male Para Athlete for his achievement at the 2019 Parapan American Games.

Results

References

External links 

 

Living people
1985 births
Powerlifters at the 2016 Summer Paralympics
Powerlifters at the 2020 Summer Paralympics
Medalists at the 2020 Summer Paralympics
Paralympic medalists in powerlifting
Paralympic bronze medalists for El Salvador
Salvadoran male weightlifters
Paralympic powerlifters of El Salvador
Sportspeople from San Salvador
Medalists at the 2019 Parapan American Games
21st-century Salvadoran people